The canton of Saint-Jean-Soleymieux is a French former administrative division located in the department of Loire and the Rhône-Alpes region. It was disbanded following the French canton reorganisation which came into effect in March 2015. It consisted of 13 communes, which joined the canton of Montbrison in 2015. It had 7,831 inhabitants (2012).

The canton comprised the following communes:

Boisset-Saint-Priest
La Chapelle-en-Lafaye
Chazelles-sur-Lavieu
Chenereilles
Gumières
Lavieu
Luriecq
Margerie-Chantagret
Marols
Montarcher
Saint-Georges-Haute-Ville
Saint-Jean-Soleymieux
Soleymieux

See also
Cantons of the Loire department

References

Former cantons of Loire (department)
2015 disestablishments in France
States and territories disestablished in 2015